A leopon  (portmanteau of leopard and lion) is the hybrid offspring of a male leopard and a female lion. The head of the animal is similar to that of a lion while the rest of the body carries similarities to leopards. These hybrids are produced in captivity and are unlikely to occur in the wild.

Description

The first documented leopon was bred at Kolhapur, India, in 1910. Its skin was sent to Reginald Innes Pocock by Walter Samuel Millard, the  Secretary of the Bombay Natural History Society.  It was a cross between a large leopard and a lioness.  Two cubs were born, one of which died aged 2.5 months, and the other was still living when Pocock described it in 1912.  Pocock wrote that it was spotted like a leopard, but that the spots on its sides were smaller and closer set than those of an Indian leopard and were brown and indistinct, like the fading spots of a juvenile lion.  The spots on the head, spine, belly and legs were black and distinct.  The tail was spotted on the topside and striped underneath and had a blackish tip with longer hairs.  The underside was dirty white, the ears were fawn and had a broad black bar, but did not have the white spot found in leopards.  Pocock wrote that the closest he had previously seen to this type of hybrid was the lijagulep (or Congolese spotted lion) bred in Chicago.

Based on the data from the Japanese cats (at the Nishinomiya City Zoo), leopons are larger than leopards and combine features from the leopard and lioness. They have brown, rather than black, spots and tufted tails. They will climb like leopards and seem to enjoy water, also like the leopard. Male leopons may have sparse manes about 20 cm long.

See also
Marozi
Lipard
Pumapard
Congolese spotted lion
 Panthera hybrid

References

 R I Pocock: (letter), "The Field", 2 November 1912.
 P L Florio: "Birth of a Lion x Leopard Hybrid in Italy", International-Zoo-News, 1983; 30(2): 4-6
 Hiroyuki Doi & Barbara Reynolds, "The Story of Leopons", GP Putnams, 1967
 Hahn, Emily, "Animal Gardens", Doubleday, 1967

External links
 Detailed information on hybridisation in big cats. Includes tigons, ligers, leopons and others.

Panthera hybrids